Manuel Alberto Diaz (born November 5, 1954) is a Cuban-American politician who served as the chair of the Florida Democratic Party from 2021 to 2023. From 2001 to 2009, he served as the mayor of Miami, Florida.

Early life and career
Diaz and his mother, Elisa, left Cuba in 1961. He graduated from Belen Jesuit Preparatory School in 1973. He scored the first touchdown in his high school's football history, and was named "Mr. Belén" in his graduating class. In 1977, Díaz received his bachelor's degree in political science from Florida International University. In 1980, he earned his Juris Doctor degree from the University of Miami School of Law.

Diaz's law firm was hired to represent Lázaro Gonzalez in the custody case over his grand-nephew Elián González. Diaz's participation in the trial and presence at the González household during the April 22, 2000 raid propelled him to national prominence.

Mayorship
Diaz ran in the 2001 Miami mayoral election as an Independent. He and Maurice Ferré were the top candidates in the first round, locking out incumbent mayor Joe Carollo. Diaz won the runoff election, and was re-elected in 2005. As mayor, Díaz remained a partner in the law firm, but stated he would not be able to take new cases.

When he first took office, Miami city government was bankrupt, held junk bond status, and was under a state financial oversight board.  Mayor Diaz pursued a vast administrative overhaul that brought with it financial stability, healthy level of financial reserves, continued tax cuts, lowered millage rates, and an A+ bond rating on Wall Street.

Diaz was awarded the "Urban Innovator of the Year" award by the Manhattan Institute in 2004. In 2007, Diaz served on the selection committee for the Rudy Bruner Award for Urban Excellence.

In 2008, Díaz became president of the U.S. Conference of Mayors. As an Independent, and a former registered Democrat, Diaz spoke at the 2008 Democratic National Convention and endorsed Obama's presidential bid. Following Obama's election, Diaz was considered for HHS Secretary; the position would ultimately go to Kathleen Sebelius.

Later career

Mayor Díaz left office in 2009 because of term limits. In the spring of 2010, Díaz was an IOP Fellow at the Kennedy School of Government at Harvard. Today Díaz is a partner at Lydecker Díaz, LLP in Miami.

On January 22, 2014, Manny Diaz and four other attorneys from his law firm, Lydecker Diaz, filed papers to represent Walmart in its battle to build in Midtown Miami.

On November 23, 2020, Diaz declared his campaign for chair of the Florida Democratic party. He has been endorsed by Mike Bloomberg, whom he supported when Bloomberg ran for president and Jorge M. Perez who has ties with both former presidents Barack Obama and Bill Clinton.

Personal life

Diaz is married to Robin Smith and has four children and three grandchildren. His son, Manny, is the defensive coordinator for the Penn State Nittany Lions football team and is the former head coach for the Miami Hurricanes football team. His daughter, Natalie, recently received her master's degree in public health with honors from Florida International University. His son, Robert, is pursuing a political science degree. His daughter, Elisa, recently received her Juris Doctor from the Florida International University College of Law. His grandchildren are Colin, Gavin, and Manny Jr.

References

External links

 Manny Díaz profile at CityMayors.com.
 Díaz, O'Naghten & Borgognoni, L.L.P..
 Lesley Clark, The Miami Herald.

|-

1954 births
American politicians of Cuban descent
Cuban emigrants to the United States
Florida Democrats
Florida Independents
Florida International University alumni
Hispanic and Latino American mayors in Florida
Living people
Mayors of Miami
People from Havana
Presidents of the United States Conference of Mayors
State political party chairs of Florida
University of Miami School of Law alumni